The 2008 Coca-Cola GM was the 38th edition of the Greenlandic Men's Football Championship. The final round was held in Qaqortoq from August 21 to 25. It was won by B-67 Nuuk for the sixth time in its history.

Qualifying stage

North Greenland
FC Malamuk and Eqaluk-56 qualified for the final Round.

Disko Bay
Nagdlunguaq-48 and Kugsak-45 qualified for the final Round.

Central Greenland

NB Some match results are unavailable.

South Greenland
Eqaluk-54 qualified for the final Round.

NB Kissaviarsuk-33 qualified for the final Round as hosts.

Final round

Pool 1

Pool 2

Playoffs

Semi-finals

Seventh-place match

Fifth-place match

Third-place match

Final

See also
Football in Greenland
Football Association of Greenland
Greenland national football team
Greenlandic Men's Football Championship

References

Greenlandic Men's Football Championship seasons
Green
Green
football